This is a list of the number-one hits of 1974 on Italian Hit Parade Singles Chart.

Number-one artists

See also
1974 in music

References

1974 in Italian music
Italy
1974